Catherine Simon (born June 15, 1953) is an American portrait photographer and writer. She is known for her photographs of influential musicians, artists, and writers, including The Clash, Patti Smith, Madonna, Andy Warhol, and William S. Burroughs. One of her photographs of Bob Marley was used on the front cover of his 1978 album, Kaya.

Simon's photography has been featured in various books, magazines, and gallery exhibitions. In 2004, she published Rebel Music: Bob Marley and Roots Reggae, a book of her photographs of Bob Marley and the Wailers published by Genesis Publications. Some of Simon's works are held in the permanent collections of the Museum of Modern Art, the Smithsonian Institution's National Portrait Gallery, and the Andy Warhol Museum.

Early life and education 
Simon was born and raised in Poughkeepsie, New York. She developed an interest in photography at an early age when her father, a doctor and amateur photographer, gave her a Polaroid camera. Simon attended George Washington University (GWU) in Washington D.C. During her second year, she studied abroad in Paris, France. She later took a photography course at GWU's Corcoran School of the Arts and Design. Shortly thereafter, she left college to pursue a career in photography.

Career

Early career 
In 1972, Simon moved to London and was initially employed at The Photographers' Gallery, staffing the front desk and the library. She then worked as an independent photographer, capturing a shot of the poet W. H. Auden after requesting to take his picture in an Oxford tea shop. Simon was later hired as a staff photographer by Dave Fudger, the art director for the music weekly, Disc. During her early career, she shot various rock artists such as Rod Stewart, Led Zeppelin, and The Rolling Stones. In 1974, she photographed David Bowie while he recorded Diamond Dogs at Olympic Studios in Barnes, west London. The next year, in 1975, she traveled as a tour photographer for Lynyrd Skynyrd, The Who, and Black Sabbath. she photographed a grinning Bob Pridden, the sound engineer for The Who, holding a pistol to the head of Skynyrd's lead vocalist Ronnie Van Zant in a Greek restaurant,.. The same year, she began photoshoots with William S. Burroughs, a writer.

Simon continued her career at additional publications such as Sounds and New Musical Express, documenting musicians from the emerging punk rock scene. On April 23, 1976, she photographed the Sex Pistols and their manager Malcolm McLaren during the moments leading up to a concert fight with the audience at the Nashville Rooms in West Kensington, capturing the violence instrumental to the group's initial publicity. The following November, she took photographs of The Clash in an alley outside Bernard Rhodes’ Rehearsal Rehearsals in Camden, north London, one of which was used for the front cover of the group's self-titled debut album.

Bob Marley 
In July 1975, Simon shot a performance by Bob Marley and The Wailers at the Lyceum Theatre in London. The next year, in 1976, she was sent to Jamaica by Chris Blackwell, the owner of Island Records, to photograph reggae artist Bunny Wailer for the promotion of his Blackheart Man album. During the trip, she also photographed Wailer's fellow reggae pioneers including Bob Marley, Peter Tosh, and Lee "Scratch" Perry. Simon captured a photograph of Marley by the pool which appeared as the front cover for his album, Kaya. The photograph was noted by Marie-Monique Robin as one of the historic images of the 20th century. Her photograph was noted in the Lens section of The New York Times by John Leland who wrote:

In 1977, Simon shot the European leg of Marley's Exodus Tour. She continued to photograph Marley for the next four years, documenting his performances and everyday life until his death in 1981.

Editorial and television 
In 1977, Simon moved to New York City and began incorporating more poised portraitures into her portfolio. The same year, she photographed Debbie Harry, the lead singer of Blondie, on the roof of a New York apartment. In 1978, Simon traveled with Queen as the group's tour photographer. She also began appearing on TV Party, a public access cable television show where she worked as the photographer and as one of Glenn O'Brien's featured co-hosts.

In 1978, Simon photographed Patti Smith and Robert Mapplethorpe outside a New York building. The following year, in 1979, she shot Michael Jackson on the set of his "Rock with You" music video. The same year, she photographed Andy Warhol reading a newspaper while she was working for his publication, Interview magazine. She also worked for Creem magazine and was later credited for her "humanizing touch" in her photographs of the era's pop culture icons. In 1981, Simon was hired as the photographer for The Face magazine. In 1983, she was assigned Madonna's first official professional photoshoot which took place on the roof of Simon's Manhattan apartment.

Select exhibitions and books 
In 1995, she photographed William S. Burroughs, a last sitting culminating a twenty-year working relationship. One of the shots from the photoshoot of Burroughs' 70th birthday at the "Bunker" was used as the cover for his first posthumous selection of works, titled Word Virus. She later contributed to Patti Smith's photo book, Patti Smith Complete, released in 1998.

In 1999, Simon's earlier photograph of Bob Marley on the Kaya album cover was included in the book, Les 100 photos du siècle, by French journalist Marie-Monique Robin. Simon was interviewed by Robin who was researching photographs previously noted by the French television series, The 100 Photos of the Century, as defining images of the 20th century. In 2008, she worked as a contributing editor for Interview magazine.

Personal life 
Simon lives in Manhattan, New York. She was previously married to David Johansen, a founding band member of the New York Dolls.

Exhibitions

Solo 
 Gallery Casa Sin Nombre, Santa Fe, New Mexico, 1989
 Govinda Gallery, Washington D.C., "Rebel Music: Bob Marley & Roots Reggae”, 2004
 Murphy and Dine Wainscott, Long Island, New York, "Life is a Killer", 2008
 Subliminal Projects, Los Angeles, California, "A Furious Heartbeat", 2009
 SHOWStudio, London, UK, "William S. Burroughs Portraits 1975–1995", 2014
 Fort Works Art Gallery, Fort Worth, Texas, "Chaos and Cosmos", 2019. 136 of Simon's photographs from 1973 to 2011.

Group 
 Portland Museum of Art, Portland, Maine, "Backstage Pass", 2009 included Simon's 2007 photograph of Iggy Pop
 Grey Art Gallery, New York University, New York City, "Downtown Pix", 2010
 Who Shot Rock & Roll: A Photographic History, 1955 to the Present, Brooklyn Museum, Brooklyn, New York, 2010. Curated by Gail Buckland. Included a portrait of Bunny Wailer taken by Simon in Kingston, Jamaica, in 1976.
 Irvine Contemporary, Washington D.C., "Image/Fame/Memory", 2011
 SHOWStudio, London, UK, “The Photography of Punk”, 2013
 The Metropolitan Museum of Art, New York City, "Punk: Chaos to Couture”, 2013
 The National Portrait Gallery/Smithsonian Institution, Washington D.C., "American Cool", 2014
Williams S. Burroughs Portraits 1975–1995, SHOWstudio, London, 2014.
 Glenn Horowitz Gallery, New York City, "The Downtown Decade", 2015
American Cool, Smithsonian Institution's National Portrait Gallery, 2014
 The Shelburne Museum, Shelburne, Vermont, "Backstage Pass: Rock and Roll Photography”, 2017
 Red Bull Studios and Hunter College Art Gallery, New York City, "I ♥︎ John Giorno", 2017
 Museum of Sex, New York City, "Punk Lust: Raw Provocation 1971–1985”, 2019
Massachusetts Museum of Contemporary Art, "The Bright and Hollow Sky", 2020

Permanent collections 
 Museum of Modern Art, New York City
 Smithsonian Institution's National Portrait Gallery, Washington, D.C.
 The Andy Warhol Museum, Pittsburgh, Pennsylvania
 New York University's Fales Library: Richard Hell Papers, New York City
 Yale University Art Gallery, New Haven, Connecticut
 Bob Marley Museum, Kingston, Jamaica

Published works 
 Simon, Kate, Rebel Music: Bob Marley & Roots Reggae. Genesis, 2004. . 400 photographs of Bob Marley and other reggae artists. Edition of 2000 copies.

Works which include her photographs 
 Alessandrini, Marjorie, Le Rock Au Féminin, Editions Albin Michel, 1980, 
Burroughs, William S., Word Virus: The William S. Burroughs Reader, Grove press, Inc., 1998, 
 Burroughs, William S., Queer, Viking Penguin Inc., 1985, 
 Edited by Charlesworth, Chris, Sex & Drugs & Rock & Roll, Bobcat Books, 1985, 
 Skerl, Jennie, William S. Burroughs, Twayne Publishers, 1985, 
 Hager, Steven, Art After Midnight: The East Village Scene, St. Martin's Press, 1986, 
 Musto, Michael, Downtown, Vintage Books, A Division of Random House, New York, 1986, 
 Acker, Kathy, Literal Madness: Kathy Goes to Haiti; My Death My Life by Pier Paolo Pasolini; Florida, Grove Press, Inc., 1988, 
 Odier, Daniel, The Job: Interviews with William S. Burroughs, Penguin Books, 1989, 
 Chamberlain, Elwyn, Then Spoke the Thunder, Grove Press, 1989, 
 Simon, Kate, Zoom Magazine, Volume 158, 1990
 Savage, Jon, England's Dreaming: The Sex Pistols and Punk Rock, Faber and Faber Limited, 1991, 
 Edited by Scholder, Amy and Silverberg, Ira, High Risk: An Anthology of Forbidden Writings, Dutton, a division of the Penguin Group, 1991, 
 Miles, Barry, Wiliam Burroughs: El Hombre Invisible, Virgin Books, 1992, 
 Burroughs, William S., Ghost of Chance, High Risk Books, 1995, 
 McNeil, Legs and McCain, Gillian, Please Kill Me: The Uncensored Oral History of Punk, Grove Press, 1996, 
 Caveney, Graham, The ‘Priest’, They Called Him: The Life and Legacy of William S. Burroughs, Bloomsbury, 1997, 
 Smith, Patti, Complete, Doubleday, 1998, 
 Robin, Marie-Monique, The Photos of the Century: 100 Historic Moments, Editions du Chêne – Hachette Livre (Original French edition), Evergreen, an imprint of Benedikt Taschen Verlag GmbH (Translated edition), 1999, 
 Edited by George-Warren, Holly, The Rolling Stone Book of the Beats: The Generation and American Culture, Rolling Stone Press, 1999, 
 DeRogatis, Jim, Let It Blurt: The Life and Times of Lester Bangs, Broadway Books, 2000, 
 Acker, Kathy, Rip-Off Red, Girl Detective and The Burning Bombing of America, Grove Press, 2002, 
 Murray, C., Rolling Stones: 40x20, Billboard Books, 2002, 
 Edited by D’Ambrosio, Antonino, Let Fury Have the Hour: The Punk Rock Politics of Joe Strummer, Nation Books, 2004, 
 Kristal, Hilly and Byrne, David, Edited by Brazis, Tamar, CBGB & OMFUG: Thirty Years from the Home of Underground Rock, Harry N. Abrams, Inc., 2005, 
 Gagosian Gallery, Cast A Cold Eye: The Late Work of Andy Warhol Exhibition Catalog, Gagosian Gallery, 2006
 Salewicz, Chris Redemption Song: The Definitive Biography of Joe Strummer, HarperCollins Publishers, 2006, 
 Farley, Christopher John, Before the Legend: The Rise of Bob Marley, Amistad, an imprint of HarperCollins Publishers, 2006, 
 Acker, Kathy, Edited by Scholder, Amy, Harryman, Carla, and Ronell, Avital, Lust for Life: on the Writings of Kathy Acker, Verso, 2006, 
 Goldman, Vivien, The Book of Exodus: The Making & Meaning of Bob Marley & the Wailers’ Album of the Century, Aurum Press Limited, 2006, 
 Purple Fashion Magazine, Volume III, Issue 8, 2007
 Strummer, Joe, The Clash, Atlantic Books, an imprint of Grove Atlantic Ltd., 2008, 
 Denenberg, Thomas, Backstage Pass: Rock and Roll Photography, Yale University Press, 2008, 
 Indiana, Gary, Andy Warhol and the Can that Sold the World, Basic Books, a member of the Perseus Books Group, 2010, 
 Curley, Mallory, A Cookie Mueller Encyclopedia, Randy Press, 2010
 Kasher, Steven, Max's Kansas City: Art, Glamour, Rock and Roll, Harry N. Abrams, 2010, 
 Buckland, Gail, Who Shot Rock & Roll: A Photographic History, 1955 – Present, Abrams Image, 2010, 
 Deitch, Jeffrey, Fairey, Shepard, and D’Ambrosio, Antonino, Mayday: The Art of Shepard Fairey, Gingko Press in association with Obey Giant, 2011, 
 Varvatos, John, John Varvatos: Rock in Fashion, Harper Design, an imprint of HarperCollins Publishers, 2013, 
 Goode, Eric and Goode, Jennifer, AREA: 1983 – 1987, Harry N. Abrams, 2013, 
 Griffin, Chloe, Edgewise: A Picture of Cookie Mueller, Bbooks Verlag, 2014, 
 Page, Jimmy, Jimmy Page, Genesis Publication and Jimmy Page, 2014, 
 Hell, Richard, I Dreamed I Was a Very Clean Tramp, Ecco, an imprint of HarperCollins Publishers, 2014, 
 Fairey, Shepard, Covert to Overt: The Under/Overground Art of Shepard Fairey, Rizzoli International Publications, Inc., 2015, 
 Sevier, Rob and Shipley, Ken, Ork Records: New York City, N. 060, The Numero Group, 2015
 Purple Fashion Magazine, Volume III, Issue 24, 2015
 Catalogue de l’exposition Jamaica Jamaica! présentée à la Philharmonie de Paris, La Découverte, 2017
 Boch, Richard, The Mudd Club, Feral House, 2017, 
 Ingham, John, Spirit of 76: London Punk Eyewitness, Anthology Editions, LLC, 2017, 
 Burroughs, William S., William S. Burroughs’ "The Revised Boy Scout Manual": An Electronic Revolution, Ohio State University Press, 2018, 
 Led Zeppelin, Led Zeppelin, Reel Art Press, 2018,  
 Hannah, Duncan, 20th Century Boy: Notebooks of the Seventies, Alfred A. Knopf, 2018, 
 Smith, Patti, Just Kids Illustrated Edition, HarperCollins, 2018, 
 Dobney, Jayson Kerr and Inciardi, Craig J., Play It Loud: Instruments of Rock & Roll Exhibition Catalog, The Metropolitan Museum of Art, 2019,

References

External links 
 

1953 births
Living people
People from Poughkeepsie, New York
American portrait photographers
20th-century American photographers
21st-century American photographers
People from Manhattan
Photographers from New York City
Rock music photographers
Corcoran School of the Arts and Design alumni
American expatriates in the United Kingdom
20th-century American women photographers
21st-century American women photographers